Zilaiskalns Parish is an administrative unit of Valmiera Municipality in the Vidzeme region of Latvia.

Towns, villages and settlements of Zilaiskalns parish 
 Zilaiskalns

References 

Parishes of Latvia
Valmiera Municipality
Vidzeme